Count of Assumar was a Portuguese title of nobility granted, on 30 March 1630, by King Philip III of Portugal, to D. Francisco de Melo, son of Constantino de Bragança, a junior member of the House of Cadaval.

As Francisco de Melo supported the  right of the Habsburgs to the Portuguese throne, even after their expulsion on 1 December 1640, the county returned to the Crown, and it was granted, again, by Prince Regent Pedro (who later became Peter II of Portugal) to D. Pedro de Almeida, on 11 April 1677.

List of the Counts of Assumar
First Creation
Francisco de Melo

Second Creation
 Pedro de Almeida (1630–1679) 
 João de Almeida Portugal (1663–1733)
 Pedro Miguel de Almeida Portugal e Vasconcelos (1688–1756), also 1st Marquis of Alorna
 João de Almeida Portugal (1726–1802), 2nd Marquis of Alorna
 Pedro de Almeida Portugal, 3rd Marquis of Alorna (1754–1813), 3rd Marquis of Alorna
 João de Almeida Portugal (1786–1805)
 Miguel de Almeida Portugal (1787–1806)
 Leonor de Almeida Portugal, 4th Marquise of Alorna, known as Alcipe (1750–1839), 4th Marchioness of Alorna.

Family name
The Counts of Assumar family name was Almeida Portugal, once the 1st Count, D. Pedro de Almeida, descended through his paternal grandfather from the Almeida family (Counts of Abrantes) and through his paternal grandmother from the Portugal family (Counts of Vimioso).

See also
List of countships in Portugal
Marquis of Alorna

External links
Genealogy of the Counts of Assumar, in Portuguese

Bibliography
”Nobreza de Portugal e do Brasil" – Vol. II, pages 328/329. Published by Zairol Lda., Lisbon 1989.

Countships of Portugal
1630 establishments in Portugal